The Burning of Louvain  was the German assault on the Belgian town of Louvain, part of the events collectively known as the Rape of Belgium, taking place during the First World War. Over the course of several days of pillaging and brutality 248 people were killed and 1,500 were deported to Germany where they were held at the Munster camp until January 1915. The Library of the Catholic University of Leuven was completely destroyed after it was set on fire by the occupying German soldiers and 1,120 of the 8,928 homes in Louvain were similarly destroyed.

Prelude
German forces had committed atrocities after invading Belgium since 4 August 1914, including mass killings of hundreds of civilians in Liege, Aarschot, and Andenne. On Tuesday, 18 August, the Belgian Army withdrew from the university town of Louvain; in the morning of the next day, Wednesday, 19 August, German forces—including infantry, artillery, uhlans, and cavalry—entered the town, encountering no resistance from the population. Civic leaders in Louvain had confiscated privately held weapons in early August, believing that individual resistance was futile and would prompt German reprisals.

Events
About 15,000 German troops occupied the town, and from 19 to 22 August, the German 1st Army made its headquarters in Louvain. The Germans took hostages from the municipal administration, magistrates, and the University of Louvain, and forced inhabitants to keep their front doors open, and windows lit throughout the night. 

On 25 August, although they had encountered no resistance from the population, German troops began a massacre. The massacre likely began when a group of  German soldiers, panicked by a false report of a major Allied offensive in the area, fired on some fellow German troops. Civilians were shot or bayoneted, homes were set on fire, and some bodies showed signs of torture. Many of those killed were randomly dumped in ditches and construction trenches. The mayor of the city and rector of the university were summarily executed.

At around 11:30 p.m., German soldiers broke unto the university's library (located in the 14th-century cloth hall), which held significant special collections, including medieval manuscripts and books, and set it on fire. Within ten hours, the library and its collection was virtually destroyed. The fire continued to burn for several days. The rector of the American College of Louvain was rescued by the Brand Whitlock, the U.S. ambassador, who recorded the rector's account of "the murder, the lust, the loot, the fires, the pillage, the evacuation and the destruction of the city" as well as the deliberate incineration of the library's incunabula. The burning of the University of Louvain's library caused the destruction of more than 230,000 books, including 750 medieval manuscripts. Personal libraries and the papers of notaries, solicitors, judges, professors, and physicians were also destroyed. 

The killings and other acts of brutality took place throughout the next night and day. The day after that, the German army bombarded the town with five shells. The town was thoroughly pillaged, with many German officers and men engaging in mass plunder of money, wine, silver, and other objects of value and killing those who resisted or did not understand. 

In the town, some 1,100 buildings were destroyed, variously estimated to constitute one-sixth or more than one-fifth of the town's structures. The town hall was saved because it was the site of the German headquarters. Some 248 civilians were killed, and most of the city's 42,000 residents were exiled by force into the countryside, with some being taken from their homes at gunpoint. Approximately 1,500 citizens of the town, including women, children, and four of the hostages, were deported to Germany in railway cattle-wagons.

Reaction
The German atrocities and the cultural destruction caused worldwide outrage. It greatly harmed Germany's standing in the neutral countries. In Britain, Prime Minister H. H. Asquith wrote that "the burning of Louvain is the worst thing [the Germans] have yet done. It reminds one of the Thirty Years' War ... and the achievements of Tilly and Wallenstein." Irish nationalists, led by John Redmond, condemned the German atrocities. Intellectuals and journalists in Italy condemned the German act, and it contributed to Italy distancing itself from Germany and Austria and drifting toward the Allies. The Daily Mail called it the "Holocaust of Louvain."

The German destruction of the university library violated Germany's obligation, as a signatory to the Hague Convention of 1907, that "in sieges and bombardment all necessary steps must be taken to spare, as far as possible, buildings dedicated to religion, art, science, or charitable purposes"; the Treaty of Versailles, which ended the First World War, included a clause to strengthen the protection of cultural property. 

The university was reopened in 1919, and the reconstructed library was inaugurated in 1927. The rector of the university, Msg. Paulin Ladeuze, said that "At Louvain, German disqualified itself as a nation of thinkers." A martyrs' monument was erected in Louvain's municipal square, overlooking a mausoleum with the remains of 138 victims. The monument features panels by Marcel Wolfers depicting the atrocities that the Germans perpetrated against the population of Louvain. The mausoleum was unveiled in 1925 by Marshal Ferdinand Foch, before an audience that included Queen Elisabeth and Cardinal Désiré-Joseph Mercier.

See also
Destruction of Kalisz

Notes

References

1914 in Belgium
Friendly fire incidents of World War I
History of Leuven
Rape of Belgium massacres